The Georgia Department of Public Health (DPH) is the principal state agency of Georgia responsible for disease prevention, promoting health as well as disaster preparedness, in conjunction with the Georgia Emergency Management Agency (GEMA). 

In 2011, DPH became an independent state agency, after previously operating as sub-agency under other state departments. 

On the state level, DPH operates through several divisions, programs and regional offices, while on the local level it finances and supports the states 159 county health departments and 18 public health districts. 

DPH’s primary responsibilities include: Health Promotion and Disease Prevention, Maternal and Child Health, Infectious Disease and Immunization, Environmental Health, Epidemiology, Emergency Preparedness and Response, Emergency Medical Services, Pharmacy, Nursing, Volunteer Health Care, the Office of Health Equity, Vital Records, and the State Public Health Laboratory.

Its headquarters are on the 15th floor of 2 Peachtree Street, NW in Downtown Atlanta.

 Kathleen E. Toomey is the commissioner.

References

External links
 Georgia Department of Public Health

Health in Georgia (U.S. state)
State agencies of Georgia (U.S. state)
State departments of health of the United States